"i am lonely will anyone speak to me" was the title of a thread that was posted on the Internet forum of the video codec downloads site Moviecodec.com, and had become "the web's top hangout for lonely folk". The thread began July 14, 2004; it was the first hit when the phrase "I am lonely" was entered into the Google search engine though it has since dropped.

It was featured in the magazines Wired, Guardian Unlimited, and The New Yorker. Bjarne Lundgren, the webmaster of Moviecodec.com, has stated "Like-minded people tend to flock together and, in this case, Google helped in flocking them together on my site".

Mark Griffiths, a researcher in internet psychology at  Nottingham Trent University in the UK, also addressed this question, stating: "There are a lot of lonely people out there. Some people rely heavily on technology and end up treating it as an electronic friend, a sounding board—just writing it down can make you feel better... That doesn't change their psychological world at that moment, but creating a kinship with like-minded people can help. You're all in this virtual space together."

Due to its large community, Bjarne created a new forum entitled "A Lonely Life", for the thread's numerous lonely inhabitants to move to. The original thread was later moved to Moviecodec.com's branch site, The Lounge Forums, but as of December 24, 2016, the website the thread is hosted on was shut down and can no longer be accessed.

See also
 Loneliness

References

External links
 . Original thread on Moviecodec forums.

Internet memes
2004 works
Internet forums